Sinocallipus  is a genus of predominantly cave-dwelling millipedes in the order Callipodida. Five of the six known species are found in limestone caves on the Indochinese Peninsula from Vietnam to southern China, and it is the only callipodidan genus entirely confined to the tropics. Sinocallipus is the sole taxon of the callipodidan suborder Sinocallipodidea, and thought to be the most primitive and sister group to all other callipodidans.
In contrast to many other millipede groups, the gonopods (reproductive legs) of Sinocallipus show little variation between species, while other characters such as color, size, and other body parts differ more noticeably between species.

Species
All species except S. thai have been collected solely from caves, and show troglomorphic (cave-adapted) traits such as pale coloration, long antennae, and long legs. S. jaegeri and S. simplipodicus show reduced eyes, consisting of only 10 to 16 colorless ocelli each, while the other species have 33 to 50 black ocelli. S. thai is unique for its dark coloration and terrestrial habitat, and correspondingly has the most ocelli and shortest antennae.

See also
Troglofauna
List of troglobites

References

Millipede genera
Cave millipedes
Millipedes of Asia
Callipodida